Katarina Taikon-Langhammer (29 July 1932 – 30 December 1995) was a Swedish Romany activist, leader in the civil rights movement, writer and actor, from the Kalderash caste. She was the sister of Rosa Taikon.

Biography
During Taikon's childhood Romani still lived in camps in Sweden, and had to move often, which made it hard for the children to get any school education. Taikon did not learn how to read and write until she was in her teens.

In 1946, Taikon was married off to a man. In 1948, a 16-year-old Taikon participated in Arne Sucksdorff's documentary short film Uppbrott, where she danced around a camp fire. The filming of the documentary made it possible for Taikon to divorce her husband. For the next decade, Taikon acted in several Swedish motion pictures.

Taikon dedicated her life to improving conditions for Romani people in Sweden and throughout the world. Through her tireless work, debating, writing and talking to Swedish authorities, the Romani were granted the same right to housing and education as all other Swedes. In 1953, the 1914 ban on Romani immigration ended. This led to other Romani seeking refuge in Sweden, and the population, at first less than a thousand people, grew. 

Taikon tried to convince Swedish authorities that these people were in fact political refugees, since they had been oppressed in their countries. After fruitless efforts to help a group of 47 French Romani gain asylum in Sweden, she decided to change her strategy. The only way to end the prejudices against her people was to address the young, she realized, so she started to write her popular series of children's books about her own childhood, Katitzi (in 1979 a TV-series based on the books was produced). Her sister Rosa later wrote: the terrible injustices of which the Gypsies have for centuries been the victims, with the result that my generation and those which preceded it were deprived of all civil rights, might have continued in our country if, around 1960, Katarina Taikon had not decided to combat prejudice and racism in all its forms, She wrote books and countless newspaper articles, approached prime ministers, the Government, Parliament and all the political parties.Katarina Taikon died of brain damage after falling into a 13 year long coma, following a cardiac arrest. She has been called the Martin Luther King of Sweden.

Filmography
2015 - Taikon
1956 - Sceningång
1953 - Åsa-Nisse på semester
1953 -  Marianne 
1951 - Tull-Bom
1950 - The Motor Cavaliers
1949 - Singoalla
1948 - Uppbrott

References

Further reading

External links 
 
 Taikon sisters on Czech Romani Radio
 Rosa Taikon about Gypsies and about her sister
 Famous Gypsies
 Katitzi by Katarina Taikon on Library Thing Site
 

1932 births
1995 deaths
Swedish Romani people
Romani writers
Romani actresses
Kalderash people
20th-century Swedish actresses
People from Örebro
Romani rights activists
20th-century Swedish women writers